Lisa DeJong (born May 12, 1989) is a Canadian para-snowboarder who competes in the SB-LL2 category.

Life and career 
DeJong won the silver medal in the women's dual banked slalom at the 2021 World Para Snow Sports Championships held in Lillehammer, Norway. She also won the silver medal in the women's snowboard cross event. DeJong and Sandrine Hamel also won the gold medal in the women's team event.

She qualified to compete in snowboarding at the 2022 Winter Paralympics in Beijing, China. She won the silver medal in the women's snowboard cross SB-LL2 event. She also competed in the women's banked slalom SB-LL2 event.

Personal life 
DeJong is married and has two daughters.

References

External links 
 Lisa DeJong at World Para Snowboard
 

1989 births
Living people
Canadian female snowboarders
Sportspeople from Saskatoon
Paralympic snowboarders of Canada
Snowboarders at the 2022 Winter Paralympics
Medalists at the 2022 Winter Paralympics
Paralympic medalists in snowboarding
Paralympic silver medalists for Canada
21st-century Canadian women